The Henry Malherbe Prize is a French literary award created in 1953 by the .  Named for Henry Malherbe, who received the Prix Goncourt in 1917, it is awarded every year for an essay.

List of winners 

1963 - Bernard Gavoty
1964 - Jean Toulat
1965 - André Jean Ducasse
1966 - René-Gustave Nobécourt
1967 - André Latreille
1968 - André Brissaud
1969 - Janine Weill
1970 - Louise Weiss
1971 - Christian Bernadac
1972 - Raymond Leopold Bruckberger
1973 - Pierre Billotte
1974 - Alain Griotteray
1975 - Georges Poisson
1976 - Michel Droit
1977 - Pierre-Paul Grasse
1978 - Jean-Émile Charon
1979 - André Piettre
1980 - Suzanne Labin
1981 - André Gillois
1982 - Frédérique Hébrard
1983 - Jacques Bloch-Morange
1984 - Yves Coppens
1985 - Jean Hamburger
1986 - Jean-André Renoux
1987 - Bernard Destremau and Albert Chambon
1988 - Claude des Presles
1989 - Pierre Deniker
1990 - Anne Muratori-Philip
1991 - Jean-Jacques Antier
1992 - Bernard Pierre
1993 - Jacques Chaban-Delmas
1994 - Michel Debré
1995 - Alain Peyrefitte
1996 - Jean-Pierre Bois
1998 - Hélène Simon
1999 - Claire Daudin
2001 - Étienne de Montety
2002 - Xavier Boniface
2003 - Philippe Masson
2004 - Arnaud Tessier
2005 - François Kersa
2006 - Annie Laurent
2008 - Stéphanie Petit
2009 - Nicolas Beaupré
2010 - Antony Beevor
2011 - Valéry Giscard d'Estaing
2012 - Paul-François Paoli
2013 - François d'Orcival
2014 - Alain Gérard
2015 - François-Xavier Bellamy
2016 - Arnaud Benedetti and Charles-Louis Foulon
2017- Jean-Noël Jeanneney

References

List of winners

French literary awards
Awards established in 1953